Paul Mitchael Frerotte (March 30, 1965 – June 11, 2008) was an American professional football player who played as a guard for four seasons in the National Football League, all with the Buffalo Bills.

Biography
Frerotte is perhaps best known for scoring three touchdowns during the 1992 NFL season, a record for an offensive lineman.

Frerotte played in three Super Bowls: XXV, XXVI, and XXVII. He attended Kittanning High School and Penn State University.

Personal life
Known as "Pit Bull" by his Bills teammates, Frerotte often wore an elaborate mask of eye black during games. He was a well-known Harley-Davidson enthusiast, who once threatened ESPN's Joe Theismann with bodily harm after he mounted Frerotte's motorcycle without permission.

Frerotte is the cousin of NFL quarterback Gus Frerotte. Mitch died from a massive heart attack at his mother's home on June 11, 2008.  The coroner's report attributed his death to hypertrophic cardiomyopathy, a genetic heart condition which the American Heart Association calls the most common cause of sudden death in young athletes.

References

External links
 Mitch Frerotte's career stats, databasefootball.com
 Pro-Football-Reference.com

1965 births
2008 deaths
American football offensive guards
Players of American football from Pennsylvania
Buffalo Bills players
Penn State Nittany Lions football players
People from Kittanning, Pennsylvania